Hori was an ancient Egyptian High Priest of Osiris at Abydos, during the reign of pharaohs Ramesses II.

Biography

Hori came from a long line of High Priests of Osiris, He was the fifth holder of the High Priesthood in his family.
He was the son of the High Priest of Osiris Wenennefer and the Chantress of Osiris Tiy.

Hori is known from several sources:
 A kneeling statue with a Horus figure, now in Copenhagen, Ny Carlsberg (AEIN 1492 - A.66)
 A kneeling statue with an Osiris figure, now in the  University of Chicago Oriental Institute (OIC 7204)
 A limestone stela from Abydos from Mariette's excavations. Hori is shown adoring Osiris and Isis.
 A relief fragment now in Cairo.
 A small stela now in Cairo.
His painted sarcophagus made between 1186-1070 B.C. is exhibited in Pápa, Hungary, since 1884.

References

High Priests of Osiris
People of the Nineteenth Dynasty of Egypt
13th-century BC clergy
Ramesses II